The Bicentennial Peru is a  left-wing parliamentary group of the Congress of the Republic of Peru. Formed in June 2022, it brings together deputies from Free Peru. The group declares itself independent but supports the actions of President Pedro Castillo.

History 
The president and first spokesperson Jorge Marticorena, the parliamentarian behind the creation of the group, decides to resign from the group of Free Peru as of 26 May 2022, when the Congress of the Republic approves the non-confidence motion of Minister Betssy Chávez.

Due to the governmental crisis of May 2022, and the wave of resignations and the different lines within the group of Free Peru (the creation of the BECN group), the three congressmen Jorge Coayla, Elías Varas and Víctor Cutipa also decide to leave Free Peru.

On 8 May, the parliamentarian José María Balcazar also announces his resignation from the parliamentary group of Free Peru.

On the same day, the five congressmen who resigned due to the evolution of the government and the lines within Free Peru, announced the creation of a new parliamentary group.

Two spokespersons for the group are appointed, Víctor Cutipa and Elías Varas.

Ideology 
The group can be designated as  left-wing. All the parliamentarians declare themselves in dissidence and disagreement with the attitude and the relationship of Waldemar Cerrón and Free Peru with the Congress of the Republic and the evolution of the relationship with President Pedro Castillo.

Nevertheless, they declare to support the action of President Pedro Castillo and his government. The group announces the main measures that the group will take, these are classified on the left and close to the ideas of Free Peru, such as constitutional reform, food sovereignty, the fight against corruption, an increase in taxes for the richest and free access to education and health.

Members

Notes

References

Parliamentary groups in Peru
Political parties established in 2022